is a district located in Kagoshima Prefecture, Japan.

As of the January 1, 2006 merger but with 2003 population statistics, the district has an estimated population of 46,943 and a density of 65.9 persons per km2. The total area is 712.55 km2.

Towns and villages
Higashikushira
Kimotsuki
Kinkō
Minamiōsumi

Mergers
On March 22, 2005 the towns of Ōnejime and Tashiro merged into the town of Kinkō.
On March 31, 2005 the towns of Nejime and Sata merged into the town of Minamiōsumi.
On July 1, 2005 the towns of Kōyama and Uchinoura merged into the town of Kimotsuki.
On January 1, 2006 the towns of Aira and Kushira, and the town of Kihoku, from Soo District, merged into the expanded city of Kanoya.

Districts in Kagoshima Prefecture